Oleksandr Loginov (born 25 June 1992) is a Canadian swimmer. He competed in the men's 50 metre freestyle event at the 2018 FINA World Swimming Championships (25 m), in Hangzhou, China.

References

External links
 

1992 births
Living people
Canadian male freestyle swimmers
Place of birth missing (living people)
Pan American Games competitors for Canada
Swimmers at the 2015 Pan American Games
Competitors at the 2017 Summer Universiade